Lieutenant Boyd Alexander (16 January 1873 – 2 April 1910) was an English officer in the British Army, as well as an explorer and ornithologist.

Early life 
Boyd was the oldest son (with a twin brother) of Lt Colonel Boyd Francis Alexander. On his mother's side he was the grandson of David Wilson, the founder of the Great Eastern Hotel in Calcutta. He was born at Swifts Park at Cranbrook in Kent and educated at Radley and Sandhurst.

Alexander was commissioned in a Militia battalion of the Rifle Brigade (Prince Consort's Own), and in October 1900 took up a commission in a regular battalion of that regiment. Promotion to lieutenant followed on 22 January 1902.

During 1902 he visited the Gold Coast Colony, where he made an ornithological survey of that colony, and in September that year he left for the Bonin Islands to investigate their avifauna.

African expedition 
Lieutenant Alexander was a member of an expedition which travelled across Africa from the Niger to the Nile, exploring the Chad Basin. Alexander was accompanied by his brother Claud, Captain G. B. Gosling and Portuguese collector José Lopes. In February 1904 they set off from the mouth of the Niger, travelling upriver to Lokoja. Claud died in October of enteric fever after making a survey of the Murchison Range. Boyd and Gosling explored the area around Lake Chad. Gosling died in June 1906 at Niangara of blackwater fever. Boyd then followed the Kibali River, reaching the Nile late in the year and returning to England in February 1907. Alexander's account From The Niger to the Nile was published later that year. In 1908 he was awarded the Founder's Medal of the Royal Geographical Society "for his three years' journey across Africa from the Niger to the Nile."

He described Willcocks's honeyguide on the basis of a specimen obtained on his 1901 expedition along the Volta river. His enthusiasm for Lake Chad was such that he and his twin brother Robert had a miniature replica of Lake Chad made alongside their family home, The Swifts, at Cranbrook.

Alexander and Lopes sailed back to Africa in 1909. They visited Claud's grave at Maifoni in Bornu and then continued to Wadai. His body was recovered by French soldiers and buried next to his brother in Maifoni. Shortly before he departed on the expedition he had become engaged to Olive MacLeod; she travelled to visit his remote grave.

Legacy 
At St Dunstan's Church, Cranbrook, there is an alabaster memorial to Boyd and Claud Alexander by William Robert Colton.

Alexander's medals are in the Royal Green Jackets (Rifles) Museum.

See also
:Category:Taxa named by Boyd Alexander

References

External links 

1873 births
1910 murders in Africa
Rifle Brigade officers
English explorers
British explorers of Africa
English ornithologists
Fellows of the Zoological Society of London
Boyd
English twins
1910 deaths